Champluviera is a genus of flowering plants belonging to the family Acanthaceae.

Its native range is Southern Nigeria to Gabon, Bioko.

Species:

Champluviera nuda 
Champluviera populifolia

References

Acanthaceae
Acanthaceae genera